Michael or Mike Rhodes may refer to:

 Michael D. Rhodes (born 1946), associate professor of ancient scripture at Brigham Young University
 Michael Rhodes (rugby league), Scottish rugby league player
 Michael Rhodes (rugby union) (born 1987), South African rugby union player
 Michael Rhodes (musician) (1953–2023), American bass guitarist
 Mike Rhodes (American football), American football quarterback
 Mike Rhodes (fighter), American mixed martial artist